Gelechia farinosa is a moth of the family Gelechiidae first described by Karl August Teich in 1899. It is found in Lithuania.

References

Moths described in 1899
Gelechia